Dimitrios Hatzinakos is an electrical engineer at the University of Toronto, Ontario. He was named a Fellow of the Institute of Electrical and Electronics Engineers (IEEE) in 2016 for his contributions to signal processing techniques for communications, multimedia, and biometrics.

References 

Fellow Members of the IEEE
Living people
Academic staff of the University of Toronto
Canadian engineers
Year of birth missing (living people)